Raiwada Reservoir is a reservoir in Devarapalle Village, 58 km  from Visakhapatnam city. It is one of the main water sources for Visakhapatnam city. Its capacity is 2,360 tcm, and it is maintained by Irrigation & CAD Dept.

References

Reservoirs in Andhra Pradesh
Reservoirs in Visakhapatnam
Geography of Visakhapatnam
Year of establishment missing